Do You Mind may refer to:
"Do You Mind" (Anthony Newley song), 1960
"Do You Mind" (Badfinger song), 1973
"Do You Mind" (DJ Khaled song), 2016
"Do You Mind" (Kyla song), 2008
"Do You Mind", a song by Robbie Williams from his 2009 album Reality Killed the Video Star